Killer by Nature is a 2012 American thriller film starring Ron Perlman and Armand Assante.

Plot
Horrific murders which once lived only in a young man's nightmares suddenly begin occurring in chilling reality in his hometown.

Cast
Zachary Ray Sherman as Owen
Ron Perlman as Dr. Julian
Armand Assante as Eugene Branch
Lin Shaye as Leona
Haley Hudson as Maggie
Richard Riehle as Warden Upton
Richard Portnow as Walter
Svetlana Efremova as Dr. Ramos
Jason Hildebrandt as Detective Marc Houlihan
Ron McCoy as Harvey
Lee de Broux as Medical Examiner
Michael A. Hamilton as Mystery Boy
Joe Taylor as Medical Examiner

References

External links
 
 

2012 films
American thriller films
2010s thriller films
2010s English-language films
2010s American films